The Glencoe is a historic apartment building located at Indianapolis, Indiana.  It was built in 1902, and is a three-story, simplified Classical Revival style yellow brick building.  It has a metal cornice, limestone detailing, and a brick parapet.

It was listed on the National Register of Historic Places in 1983.

References

External links

Residential buildings on the National Register of Historic Places in Indiana
Residential buildings completed in 1902
Neoclassical architecture in Indiana
Residential buildings in Indianapolis
National Register of Historic Places in Indianapolis